The Olenti is a river in the West Kazakhstan Region, Kazakhstan.

The Olenti belongs to the Ural basin. The name of the river originated in the Kazakh word for sedge.

Course 
The Olenti has its sources east of lake Shalkar, in the area between the Caspian Depression and the Mughalzhar Hills (Pre-Ural Plateau). It heads roughly southwestwards across Syrym District. The Buldyrty river flows roughly parallel to the southeast of that stretch. Then the Olenti bends southwards near the village of Saykudyk in Akzhaik District and flows almost straight in that direction. Finally it divides into shallow arms and its waters sink in the sand shortly before reaching lake Tuzdy to the SSE. Its main tributary is the Shiderti from the left.

It is fed by snow and rain, flowing mainly in March and April after the thaw. In the summer the Olenti stops flowing and breaks up into small pools.

Fauna 
The main fish species in the Olenti include carp, bream, pike and perch.

See also
List of rivers of Kazakhstan

References

External links

Rivers of the West Kazakhstan region.

Rivers of Kazakhstan
West Kazakhstan Region
Endorheic basins of Asia
Ural basin
Caspian Depression